Francis Murnaghan may refer to:
 Francis Dominic Murnaghan (mathematician) (1893–1976), Irish mathematician
 Francis Dominic Murnaghan Jr. (1920–2000), U.S. federal judge, son of the latter